Kellys Creek is a tributary of the Kanawha River,  long, in West Virginia in the United States.

Kellys Creek flows for its entire length in eastern Kanawha County. It flows into the Kanawha River on the common boundary between the two towns. The creek is paralleled by county roads for most of its course.

The creek was named after Walter Kelly, an early settler. According to the Geographic Names Information System, Kellys Creek has also been known historically by the variant spellings “Kelley Creek,” “Kelley's Creek,” “Kelly Creek,” and “Kelly's Creek.”

See also
List of rivers of West Virginia

References 

Rivers of West Virginia
Rivers of Kanawha County, West Virginia
Tributaries of the Kanawha River